Sri Andalas is a township in Klang district in Selangor, Malaysia. It is located near Port Klang, one of the main ports of Malaysia.

External links
Klang Municipal Council - administrator of Taman Sri Andalas

Klang District
Townships in Selangor